Oppido may refer to:

 Oppido Lucano, Italian municipality of the Province of Potenza, Basilicata, Italy
 Oppido Mamertina, Italian municipality of the Province of Reggio Calabria, Calabria, Italy

See also
 Oppidum, a large fortified Iron Age settlement
 D'Oppido, a surname